The Farrell Block is a historic commercial building in Hastings, Nebraska. It was built in 1880 for Thomas E. Farrell, a surveyor for the St. Joseph and Denver Railroad Company and a co-founder of the city of Hastings. Farrell also served on Hastings' city council in  1874, 1875, and 1887. The second floor houses the county courthouse until a courthouse was completed in 1890. The building, designed by architect Charles Rittenhouse, has been listed on the National Register of Historic Places since May 1, 1979.

References

National Register of Historic Places in Adams County, Nebraska
Buildings and structures completed in 1880